Matthias Hagner (born 15 August 1974 in Gießen) is a German former professional footballer who played as a midfielder.

References

External links 
 

1974 births
Living people
Sportspeople from Giessen
German footballers
Footballers from Hesse
Association football midfielders
Germany under-21 international footballers
Bundesliga players
2. Bundesliga players
Eintracht Frankfurt players
Eintracht Frankfurt II players
VfB Stuttgart players
Borussia Mönchengladbach players
SpVgg Greuther Fürth players
1. FC Saarbrücken players
FSV Frankfurt players
German football managers
Sportfreunde Siegen managers
West German footballers